Dekorative Kunst (meaning Decorative Art in English) was a German avant-garde art magazine published from October 1897 to 1929. The magazine promoted the Jugendstil or Art Nouveau style and was founded by Julius Meier-Graefe. The publisher of the magazine was Alexander Koch. It was based in Munich where it was published on a monthly basis. It had a sister magazine, Die Kunst, which was a fine arts magazine.

In 1929 the magazine was renamed Das schöne Heim.

References

External links
Six issues of Dekorative Kunst published between October 1897 and March 1898

1897 establishments in Germany
1929 disestablishments in Germany
Art Nouveau magazines
Defunct literary magazines published in Germany
German-language magazines
Magazines established in 1897
Magazines disestablished in 1929
Magazines published in Munich
Monthly magazines published in Germany
Visual arts magazines published in Germany